The Eurasian golden oriole (Oriolus oriolus) also called the common golden oriole, is the only member of the Old World oriole family of passerine birds breeding in Northern Hemisphere temperate regions. It is a summer migrant in Europe and Palearctic and spends the winter season in central and southern Africa.

Golden orioles have an extremely large range with large populations that are apparently stable. Therefore, they are evaluated as least concern by BirdLife International.

Taxonomy and systematics
The Eurasian golden oriole was described by Carl Linnaeus in 1758 in the tenth edition of his Systema Naturae and given the binomial name Coracias oriolus.

The Eurasian golden oriole and the Indian golden oriole were formerly considered as conspecific, but in 2005 they were treated as separate species by the ornithologists Pamela Rasmussen and John Anderton, in the first edition of their Birds of South Asia. Support for this split was provided by a molecular phylogenetic study published in 2010, and most ornithologists now treat the Indian golden oriole as a separate species. Alternate names for the Eurasian golden oriole include the European golden oriole and western Eurasian golden oriole. The species is monotypic.

Etymology
The name "oriole" was first used in the 18th century and is an adaptation of the scientific Latin genus name, which is derived from the Classical Latin "aureolus" meaning golden. Various forms of "oriole" have existed in Romance languages since the 12th and 13th centuries. Albertus Magnus used the Latin form oriolus in about 1250 and erroneously stated that it was onomatopoeic because of the golden oriole's song. In medieval England its name, derived from the song, was the woodwele.

Description
The male is striking in the typical oriole black and yellow plumage, but the female is a drabber green bird. Orioles are shy, and even the male is remarkably difficult to see in the dappled yellow and green leaves of the canopy. In flight they look somewhat like a thrush, strong and direct with some shallow dips over longer distances. The New World orioles are similar in appearance to the Oriolidae, but are icterids and unrelated to the Old World birds.

Its call is a harsh "kweeaahk", but the song is a fluting weela-wee-ooo or or-iii-ole, unmistakable once heard, often with subtle variations between each phrase. Despite being relatively small, the song, normally sung from the top of a tree, carries for a long distance across the landscape. Although these are its two most readily identified sounds, it does make a variety of other sounds.

The male of the Indian golden oriole (Oriolus kundoo) has the black eye-stripe extending behind the eye, has a longer and paler red bill and has more yellow in the plumage.

Distribution and habitat
The breeding range of this species spans from western Europe and Scandinavia east to China. They winter in central and southern Africa. They generally migrate during the night, but may travel during the day in the spring migration. During the autumn migration they migrate via the Eastern Mediterranean where they feed on fruit; they are often considered a pest in this region because of this.

Though not resident, Eurasian golden orioles are regularly recorded as summer passage migrants in Great Britain, and occur in small numbers on the South Coast of England and in East Anglia. On average, around 85 birds are recorded in Great Britain annually.  

The Eurasian golden oriole inhabits a range of habitats. In Western Europe they prefer open broadleaf forests and plantations, copses, riverine forest, orchards, large gardens; in Eastern Europe they may inhabit more continuous forest as well as mixed or coniferous forests. They generally avoid treeless habitats but may forage there. In their wintering habitat they are found in semi-arid to humid woodland, tall forests, riverine forest, woodland/savanna mosaic and savanna.

Behaviour and ecology

Breeding
Eurasian golden orioles may delay breeding until they are 2 or 3 years of age. Males usually arrive at breeding area several days before the females. The fidelity to a territory or even to a specific nest site suggests that the pair-bond may continue from one breeding season to the next. The nest is placed high in a tree towards the edge of the crown. The deep cup-shaped nest is suspended below a horizontal fork of thin branches. It is built by the female, but the male will sometimes gather some of the material. The clutch is usually between 3 and 5 eggs. These are laid at daily intervals early in the morning. They can be white, cream or very pale pink and are decorated with black marks which are sometimes concentrated at the larger end. The eggs are mainly incubated by the female but the male will incubate for short periods to allow the female to feed. The eggs hatch after 16–17 days. The young are fed by both parents but are mostly brooded by the female. The young fledge after 16–17 days. The clutch is only rarely lost to predators as the parents vigorously defend their nest.

The greatest recorded age for a Eurasian golden oriole is 10 years and 1 month for a male that was ringed in Lincolnshire in 1986 and seen alive in Cambridgeshire in 1996.

Feeding
They feed on insects and fruit, using their bills to pick insects out of crevices.

Conservation 
Since 1987, the Golden Oriole Group and the Royal Society for the Protection of Birds have been engaged in protecting known Eurasian golden oriole breeding sites in East Anglia.

References

Sources

External links

Ageing and sexing (PDF; 5.3 MB) by Javier Blasco-Zumeta & Gerd-Michael Heinze 
Internet Bird Collection: Golden Oriole videos, photos and sounds
 (European =) Eurasian golden oriole - Species text in The Atlas of Southern African Birds.
Listen to an oriole singing
 Xeno-canto: audio recordings of the Eurasian golden oriole

Eurasian golden oriole
Birds of Eurasia
Birds of Africa
Eurasian golden oriole
Eurasian golden oriole
Birds of Iran